In mathematics, the surgery structure set  is the basic object in the study of manifolds which are homotopy equivalent to a closed manifold X. It is a concept which helps to answer the question whether two homotopy equivalent manifolds are diffeomorphic (or PL-homeomorphic or homeomorphic). There are different versions of the structure set depending on the category (DIFF, PL or TOP) and whether Whitehead torsion is taken into account or not.

Definition 

Let X be a closed smooth (or PL- or topological) manifold of dimension n.
The structure set  is the set of equivalence classes of homotopy equivalences  from closed manifolds of dimension n to X.
This set has a preferred base point: .

There is also a version which takes Whitehead torsion into account.

Remarks 

Notice that  in the definition of  resp.  is an h-cobordism resp. an s-cobordism. Using the s-cobordism theorem we obtain another description for the simple structure set , provided that n>4: The simple structure set  is the set of equivalence classes of homotopy equivalences  from closed manifolds  of dimension n to X with respect to the following equivalence relation. Two homotopy equivalences  (i=0,1) are equivalent if there exists a

If we deal with topological manifolds, it is possible to endow  with a preferred structure of an abelian group (see chapter 18 in the book of  Ranicki).

Some care is necessary because it may be possible that a given simple homotopy equivalence  is not homotopic to a diffeomorphism (or PL-homeomorphism or homeomorphism) although M and X are diffeomorphic (or PL-homeomorphic or homeomorphic).

The basic tool to compute the simple structure set is the surgery exact sequence.

Examples 

Topological Spheres: The generalized Poincaré conjecture in the topological category says that  only consists of the base point. This conjecture was proved by Smale (n > 4), Freedman (n = 4) and Perelman (n = 3).

Exotic Spheres: The classification of exotic spheres by Kervaire and Milnor gives  for n > 4 (smooth category).

References

External links
Andrew Ranicki's homepage
Shmuel Weinberger's homepage

Geometric topology
Algebraic topology
Quadratic forms
Surgery theory